Super Black Market Clash is a 1993 compilation album released by the English punk rock band The Clash. It contains B-sides and rare tracks not available on the group's regular studio albums. The album is an expanded repackaging of the 1980 release Black Market Clash, a 10-inch EP containing nine songs. The man in the foreground of the front cover art on both releases is Don Letts, who worked with The Clash on several projects and later was a founding member of Big Audio Dynamite.

Black Market Clash

Black Market Clash was released in October 1980, only in the US and Canada, in between London Calling and Sandinista!. It compiled recordings which were then unavailable in the US except as imports. The disc was one in the series of "Nu-Disk" 10-inch records from Epic.  Other artists in the series included New Musik and Cheap Trick.

"The Prisoner," the cover of "Pressure Drop" by Toots and the Maytals, "City of the Dead," and "Armagideon Time" had all been UK b-sides from the period 1977–79, respectively of "White Man in Hammersmith Palais," "English Civil War," "Complete Control," and "London Calling." "Pressure Drop" is presented here in a remix by Bill Price.

At the time of release, this was the only record that featured the cover of the "Time Is Tight" instrumental by Booker T & the MGs. "Capital Radio" was extremely rare in the UK.  Rather than re-issue the original the group recorded a new version for The Cost of Living as "Capital Radio Two." "Cheat" is from their UK debut album but had been left off the US version.

"Bankrobber" had been a UK A-side. "Robber Dub" was originally intended for the b-side of an unreleased "Bankrobber" 12" dance club single.  The two tracks appear here in a combined edit that is unique to Black Market Clash. "Justice Tonight/Kick It Over", the dub version of "Armagideon Time", is the last track. This was previously available as the B-side to the 12-inch "London Calling" club single. The full length version of "Justice Tonight/Kick It Over" is 8:54 and the 7:00 edited version is also unique to Black Market Clash.

Black Market Clash was reissued in the 1980s on 12-inch vinyl and cassette, with the same track listing as the 10-inch. It was re-released on compact disc in 1991, but discontinued when Super Black Market Clash replaced it. It was available again for a short period of time in 2006 in a few countries. It was reissued on 10-inch vinyl again in 2011.

Black Market Clash was issued in Japan in 1992, with liner notes in Japanese.

Track listing
All songs written by Joe Strummer and Mick Jones, except where noted.

Side one
 "Capital Radio One" – 2:09
 "The Prisoner" – 3:00
 "Pressure Drop" (Toots Hibbert) – 3:30
 "Cheat" – 2:06
 "The City of the Dead" – 2:26
 "Time Is Tight" (Booker T. Jones, Steve Cropper, Donald "Duck" Dunn, Al Jackson) – 4:05

Side two
 "Bankrobber/Robber Dub" (Strummer, Jones, Mikey Dread) – 6:16
 "Armagideon Time" (Willie Williams, Jackie Mittoo) – 3:50
 "Justice Tonight/Kick It Over" (edit) (Williams, Mittoo) – 7:00

Personnel
 Joe Strummer – lead vocals, guitars, piano, organ
 Mick Jones – guitars, vocals, piano, harmonica, sound effects
 Paul Simonon – bass guitar, vocals
 Terry Chimes – drums on "Capital Radio" and "Cheat"
 Topper Headon – drums and percussion on "The Prisoner", "Pressure Drop", "The City of the Dead", "Time Is Tight", "Bankrobber"/"Robber Dub," "Armagideon Time", and "Justice Tonight"/"Kick It Over"

Additional musicians
 Mick Gallagher - ARP synthesizer and piano on "Bankrobber", organ on "Armagideon Time"
 Gary Barnacle – saxophone on "Time Is Tight" and "The City of the Dead"

Charts

Super Black Market Clash

Super Black Market Clash is a compilation album released by The Clash in 1993, containing B-sides and rare tracks not available on their studio albums. It is an expanded repackaging of the 1980 Black Market Clash EP, a single 10" record with nine songs. The cover art follows the design of the original but is rendered in different colors.

Super Black Market Clash was released on CD and in a 3x10" vinyl edition, but does not contain the tracks "Capital Radio One", "Cheat", "Bankrobber/Robber Dub" or "Armagideon Time" found on the original EP. At the time of re-release, "Capital Radio One", "Bankrobber" and "Armagideon Time" had recently been included on the compilations The Story of the Clash, Volume 1 and Clash on Broadway, so omitting the tracks did not affect their availability. The extended release also replaces the version of "Pressure Drop" that appeared on Black Market Clash with the B-side mix, and "Justice Tonight/Kick It Over" is a longer version than the track on Black Market Clash.

With 21 tracks, Super Black Market Clash does not fully compile the Clash's B-sides and rarities. It does however contain important songs, such as three from The Cost of Living EP and several B-sides previously unavailable on CD including "The Cool Out" (a remix of "The Call Up") and "Long Time Jerk" (although in a shorter version than appeared as the B-side to "Rock the Casbah").

The artwork for the remaster corrects an error in the track listing on the original ("Pressure Drop" was listed as track 5 and "The Prisoner" as track 6 when they actually play in the opposite sequence). The original version of the revised artwork also introduced a new error by listing "Radio Clash" as "This Is Radio Clash" (the former song, which appears on the album, is the B-side to the latter song which does not), corrected on later pressings.

The Clash's entire catalog, including this album, was remastered and re-released in January 2000.

Track listing

Personnel
 Joe Strummer – lead vocals, rhythm guitar, piano
 Mick Jones – lead guitar, vocals, piano
 Paul Simonon – bass, vocals
 Terry Chimes – drums on "1977" and "Listen"
 Topper Headon – drums, percussion on all other tracks

Additional musicians
 Gary Barnacle – saxophone on "1–2 Crush on You" and "Time Is Tight"

References

B-side compilation albums
1980 EPs
The Clash EPs
The Clash compilation albums
1993 compilation albums
Epic Records EPs
Epic Records compilation albums